Zack Bell is a Canadian politician, who was elected to the Legislative Assembly of Prince Edward Island in a by-election on November 2, 2020. He represents the district of Charlottetown-Winsloe as a member of the Progressive Conservative Party of Prince Edward Island.

His victory lifted the government of Dennis King from minority to majority status.

References 

Living people
Progressive Conservative Party of Prince Edward Island MLAs
People from Charlottetown
21st-century Canadian politicians
Year of birth missing (living people)